The Obispo Formation is a Dapingian geologic formation of southern Bolivia. The shales and siltstones were deposited in an open marine environment.

Fossil content 
The formation has provided the following fossils:

 Camerella sp.
 Ceratiocaris sp.
 Didymograptus sp.
 Dinorthis sp.
 Endoceras sp.
 Euorthisina sp.
 Hoekaspis sp.
 Hypermecaspis sp.
 Incorthis sp.
 Megistaspis sp.
 Niobides sp.
 Orthis sp.
 Orthoceras sp.
 Pachendoceras sp.
 Thysanopyge sp.

See also 
 List of fossiliferous stratigraphic units in Bolivia

References

Further reading 
 L. Branisa. 1965. Los fosiles guias de Bolivia: I. Paleozoico. Boletin de Servicio Geologico de Bolivia. La Paz, Bolivia 6:1-282
 A. Pribyl and J. Vanek. 1980. Ordovician trilobites of Bolivia. Rozpravy Ceskoslovenske Akademie Ved. Rada Matematickych a Prirodnich Ved. Academia Praha, Prague, Czechoslovakia 90(2):1-90

Geologic formations of Bolivia
Ordovician System of South America
Ordovician Bolivia
Dapingian
Shale formations
Siltstone formations
Open marine deposits
Ordovician southern paleotemperate deposits
Paleontology in Bolivia
Formations